Prostanthera campbellii is a species of flowering plant in the family Lamiaceae and is endemic to the south-west of Western Australia. It is an erect shrub with linear leaves and white to cream-coloured flowers with purple striations.

Description
Flowering occurs from July to November.

Taxonomy
Prostanthera campbellii was first formally described in 1882 by Ferdinand von Mueller in the journal Southern Science Record from specimens collected by John Forrest near the Gascoyne River. The specific epithet honours the politician Thomas Cockburn-Campbell.

Distribution and habitat
This mintbush grows on granite outcrops and rocky places in the South-West and Eremaean botanical regions of Western Australia.

Conservation status
Prostanthera campbellii is classified as "not threatened" by the Western Australian Government Department of Parks and Wildlife.

References

campbellii
Flora of Western Australia
Lamiales of Australia
Taxa named by Ferdinand von Mueller
Plants described in 1882